Six Nations Polytechnic (SNP) is a Haudenosaunee-governed Indigenous institute on Six Nations of the Grand River First Nation. SNP is an Indigenous Institute, the third pillar of post-secondary education in Ontario, as recognized by the Indigenous Institutes Act of 2017, The Six Nations of the Grand River First Nation are the Mohawk, Cayuga, Onondaga, Oneida, Seneca, and Tuscarora. The Six Nations of the Grand River First Nation reserve acreage at present covers some  near the city of Brantford, Ontario. Six Nations Polytechnic has two campuses, one located in Ohsweken and one located in Brantford. 

Indigenous institutes partner with colleges and universities to offer students degree programs, apprenticeships, certificate programs and diploma programs. SNP was founded to provide greater access to post-secondary education for Indigenous peoples. SNP delivers post-secondary programs approved by the Ministry of Training, Colleges and Universities.

History
Since 1993, Six Nations Polytechnic has offered college and university programs through agreements with public colleges and universities.
On June 26, 2009 – the Indigenous Knowledge Centre and Ogweho:weh Diploma Programs [Gayogohó:non-Cayuga and Kayenkeha -Mohawk] were publicly launched with the signing of the Six Nations and McMaster University Collaborative Agreement. These university credit diploma programs will eventually become full degree programs for Haudenosaunee languages.

Partnerships

Six Nations Polytechnic offers programs and courses of study in partnership with all levels of government; commissions; industries; commerce and post-secondary institutions.

Scholarships and bursaries
SNP offers scholarships for First Nations and Métis students.

Six Nations Achievement Centre
The Six Nations Achievement Centre was founded in 1993 as a community-based agency providing adults with tutoring in Literacy and Basic Skills, in a culturally sensitive manner to increase their academic skills for entry into higher level of education and/or to obtain employment. The funding is provided by the Ministry of Training, Colleges and Universities, Literacy and Basic Skills Branch. The Six Nations Achievement Centre is a member of the Brant Literacy Service Planning (LSP) and the Ontario Native Literacy Coalition.

Campus

The main campus is a building located on 2160 Fourth Line in Ohsweken, Ontario.

A second campus is located at 411 Elgin Street in Brantford, Ontario.

References

External links
snpolytechnic.com
https://iicontario.ca/

1993 establishments in Ontario
Educational institutions established in 1993
First Nations education
Iroquois
Indigenous universities and colleges in North America
Universities and colleges in Ontario